Argyrotaenia ponera is a species of moth of the family Tortricidae. It is found in Puebla, Mexico.

The length of the forewings is 11–13 mm. The forewings are light brown with a silver-white dot and a darker brownish copper longitudinal streak immediately above a white longitudinal streak. The hindwings are pale grey.

References

Moths described in 1914
ponera
Moths of Central America